Boubacar Moungoro (born September 22, 1994) is a Malian professional basketball player. He declared for the 2014 NBA draft after averaging 8.0 points and 2.5 rebounds with Baloncesto Fuenlabrada.

Professional career
Moungoro forwent college after completing his high school career with IMG Academy in Bradenton, Florida. The Bamako native is currently represented by agent Travis King, who has also worked with Robert Covington, and Amar'e Stoudemire in the past. Moungoro has also played for the youth teams of the Mali national basketball team in the past, logging an average of 26 minutes in the 2013 Nike Global Challenge. On November 3, he was acquired by the Oklahoma City Blue after a successful tryout.

Mali national team
In February 2015, it was announced that Moungoro would join the Mali national team at play in the 2015 FIBA Africa Championship qualification against Senegal. In the first game, won by Mali by 65–43, Moungoro scored 12 points and retrieved five rebounds, while in the second leg he scored seven points in the win abroad of his team by 50–47.

References

External links
Profile at ACB.com
Profile at FEB.es

1994 births
Living people
Baloncesto Fuenlabrada players
Liga ACB players
Malian men's basketball players
Oklahoma City Blue players
Shooting guards
Small forwards
Sportspeople from Bamako
21st-century Malian people